Divisional Public Schools and Colleges (DPS or DPSC), established in 1963, is a series of mega-schools at the division level in Punjab, Pakistan.  The series consists of one of the largest institutions providing education at school level in Pakistan. They are selective schools. The scheme of Divisional Public Schools was initiated in 1958-59, when the “Sharif Commission”, a special commission on national education for secondary education submitted detailed recommendations on primary through post-graduate education.

Such institutions were named Divisional Public Schools; the funds required to initiate their operation and maintenance were to be generated through private philanthropy. These institutions were not allowed to charge fee more than necessary expenditures.

All the Divisional Public Schools are the offshoots of this plan and owe their existence to the recommendations of the Sharif Commission. The first two Schools were simultaneously built in Faisalabad and Model Town, Lahore in 1963. Later, such schools were established in Sahiwal, Sargodha, Gujranwala, Rawalpindi and Dera Ghazi Khan.

Divisional Public Schools are the largest schools regarding their area in almost all cities, except Lahore where Aitchison College is largest.

Divisional Commissioners are generally the chairmen of BOG of Divisional Public Schools.

Schools 
The following autonomous campuses are currently running.
 Divisional Public School, Bahawalnagar
 Divisional Public School, Chichawatni
 Divisional Public School, Burewala
 Divisional Public School, Dunyapur
 Divisional Public School and College, D.G Khan
 Divisional Public School, Faisalabad
 Divisional Public School, Model Town, Lahore
 Divisional Public School, Township, Lahore
 Divisional Public School, Lalamusa
 Divisional Public School and College, Sahiwal
 Divisional Public School and College, Sargodha
 Divisional Public School, Samundri
 Divisional Public School and College, Rawalpindi
 Divisional Public School, Toba Tek Singh
 Quaid-E-Azam Divisional Public School and College

Notable people
Abid Sher Ali
Atif Aslam
Noman Ijaz
Saad Salman
Sami Khan

Gallery

References

Schools in Punjab, Pakistan
School systems in Pakistan
1963 establishments in Pakistan
Educational institutions established in 1963